Shoreditch is a district in the East End of London in England, and forms the southern part of the London Borough of Hackney. Neighbouring parts of Tower Hamlets are also perceived as part of the area.

In the 16th century, Shoreditch was an important centre of the Elizabethan Theatre, and it has been an important entertainment centre since that time. Today, it hosts many pubs, bars and nightclubs. The most commercial areas lie closest to the city of London and along the A10 Road, with the rest mostly residential.

Toponymy
Early spellings of the name include Soredich (c.1148), Soresdic (1183–4), Sordig (1204), Schoresdich (1220–21), and other variants. Toponymists are generally agreed that the name derives from Old English "scoradīc", i.e. "shore-ditch", the shore being a riverbank or prominent slope; but there is disagreement as to the identity of the "shore" in question. A suggestion made by Eilert Ekwall in 1936 that the "ditch" might have been one leading to the "shore" of the Thames continues to enjoy widespread currency. Other scholars, however, have challenged this interpretation on the grounds that the City of London lies between Shoreditch and the Thames. A variant spelling used by John Stow in 1598, Sewers Ditche, raises the possibility that the name might originally have referred to a drain or watercourse. Certainly the area was once boggy, and the name might bear some relation to the main branch of the Walbrook, which rose in Hoxton, ran along what is now Curtain Road, flowing past the former Curtain Theatre. The river was known in this area as the Deepditch, Flood Ditch or just The Ditch.

Folk etymology holds that the place was originally named "Shore's Ditch", after Jane Shore, the mistress of Edward IV, who is supposed to have died or been buried in a ditch in the area. This legend is commemorated today by a large painting, at Haggerston Branch Library, of the body of Shore being retrieved from the ditch, and by a design on glazed tiles in a shop in Shoreditch High Street showing her meeting Edward IV. However, the area was known as Shoreditch long before Jane Shore lived: the Survey of London, for example, lists some 26 deeds dating from between c.1148 and 1260 which use some version of the name.

In another theory, also now discredited, antiquarian John Weever claimed that the name was derived from Sir John de Soerdich, who was lord of the manor during the reign of Edward III (132777).

History

Origins

Though now part of Inner London, Shoreditch was previously an extramural suburb of the City of London, centred on Shoreditch Church at the old crossroads where Shoreditch High Street and Kingsland Road are crossed by Old Street and Hackney Road.

Shoreditch High Street and Kingsland Road are a small sector of the Roman Ermine Street and modern A10. Known also as the Old North Road, it was a major coaching route to the north, exiting the City at Bishopsgate. The east–west course of Old Street–Hackney Road was also probably originally a Roman Road, connecting Silchester with Colchester, bypassing the City of London to the south.

Shoreditch Church (officially known as St Leonard's, Shoreditch) is of ancient origin. It is featured in the famous line "when I grow rich say the bells of Shoreditch", from the English nursery rhyme "Oranges and Lemons".

Shoreditch was the site of a house of canonesses, the Augustinian Holywell Priory (named after a Holy Well on the site), from the 12th century until its dissolution in 1539. This priory was located between Shoreditch High Street and Curtain Road to east and west, and Batemans Row and Holywell Lane to north and south. Nothing remains of it today.

Shakespeare and the Elizabethan theatre

In 1574 the City authorities banned the building of playhouses in the City of London area, consequently theatres were built in the suburbs, beyond its jurisdiction.

The first of these came in 1576, when James Burbage built the first playhouse in England, known as "The Theatre", on the site of the Priory (commemorated today by a plaque on Curtain Road, and excavated in 2008, by MoLAS).

William Shakespeare lived nearby in a property overlooking St Helen's churchyard in the Bishopsgate Within area of the City. Romeo and Juliet was first performed here, gaining "Curtain plaudits", Henry V was performed within "this wooden O" and an early version of Hamlet was also first staged in Shoreditch.

Shakespeare's Company moved the timbers of "The Theatre" to Southwark at the expiration of the lease in 1599, in order to construct the Globe. The Curtain continued performing plays in Shoreditch until at least 1627.

The suburb of Shoreditch was attractive as a location for these early theatres because, like Southwark, it was outside the jurisdiction of the somewhat puritanical City fathers. Even so, they drew the wrath of contemporary moralists, as did the local "base tenements and houses of unlawful and disorderly resort" and the "great number of dissolute, loose, and insolent people harboured in such and the like noisome and disorderly houses, as namely poor cottages, and habitations of beggars and people without trade, stables, inns, alehouses, taverns, garden-houses converted to dwellings, ordinaries, dicing houses, bowling alleys, and brothel houses".

17th and 18th centuries
During the 17th century, wealthy traders and French Huguenot silkweavers moved to the area, establishing a textile industry centred to the south around Spitalfields. By the 19th century, Shoreditch was also the locus of the furniture industry, now commemorated in the Geffrye Museum on Kingsland Road. These industries declined in the late 19th century.

Victorian entertainments

In the 19th and early 20th centuries, Shoreditch was a centre of entertainment to rival the West End and had many theatres and music halls:

 The National Standard Theatre, 2/3/4 Shoreditch High Street (1837–1940). In the late 19th century this was one of the largest theatres in London. In 1926, it was converted into a cinema called The New Olympia Picturedrome. The building was demolished in 1940. Sims Reeves, Mrs Marriott and James Anderson all appeared here; also performed were programmes of classical opera and even Shakespeare, with actors including Henry Irving. There was considerable rivalry with the West End theatres. John Douglass (the owner, from 1845) wrote a letter to The Era following a Drury Lane first night, in which he commented that "seeing that a hansom cab is used in the new drama at Drury Lane, I beg to state that a hansom cab, drawn by a live horse was used in my drama ... produced at the Standard Theatre ... with real rain, a real flood, and a real balloon."
 The Shoreditch Empire, also known as The London Music Hall, 95–99 Shoreditch High Street (1856–1935). The theatre was rebuilt in 1894 by Frank Matcham, the architect of the Hackney Empire. Charlie Chaplin is recorded as performing here, in his early days, before he achieved fame in America. Purchased in 1934 by adjacent drapery business Jeremiah Rotherham & Co and rebuilt as a warehouse.
 The Royal Cambridge Music Hall, 136 Commercial Street (1864–1936), was destroyed by fire in 1896, then rebuilt in 1897 by Finch Hill, architect of the Britannia Theatre, in nearby Hoxton. The Builder of 4 December 1897 said "The New Cambridge Music Hall in Commercial Street, Bishopsgate, is now nearing completion. The premises will be heated throughout by hot water coils, and provision has been made for lighting the house by electric light."

None of these places of entertainment survives today. Music hall was revived for a brief time in Curtain Road by the temporary home of the Brick Lane Music Hall. This too has now moved on.

A number of playbills and posters from these music halls survive in the collections of both the Bishopsgate Institute and the Victoria and Albert Museum.

WW1 – Shoreditch Pals
In the First World War, the Mayor and Borough of Shoreditch raised a pals battalion of volunteers from around the borough who would serve together as the 20th (Shoreditch) Battalion, Middlesex Regiment (Duke of Cambridge's Own). The Middlesex Regiment the battalion belonged to was nicknamed the "Die-hards".

For most of its time in the line, the unit was attached to 118th Brigade, part of the 39th Division. The battalion was involved in many actions on the Western Front in 1916–18.

Pre War
Syd's coffee stall was established in Calvert Avenue, Shoreditch in 1919 and operated continuously until 2019.

Gainsborough Studios were located in a former power station, in Poole Street, by the Regents Canal. The film studios operated there from 1924 until it declined and closed in 1951.

The Stag's Head, Hoxton was built in 1936 for Truman's Brewery, and designed by their in-house architect A. E. Sewell.

WW2 Bombing
Shoreditch was heavily bombed during World War II, with around 495 of its residents killed.

The area was hit by at least 279 high explosive bombs, 6 parachute mines 7 V-1 'doodlebugs', 2 V-2 rockets and many thousands of 1 kg incendiary devices. The destruction of housing and industry caused by the two V-2s contributed to the opportunity to create Shoreditch Park and Haggerston Park.

Decline
Shoreditch post-war declined in conditions, as did both textile and furniture industries with competition elsewhere. This situation was exacerbated by the extensive devastation of the housing stock in the Blitz during the Second World War, and by insensitive redevelopment in the post-war period.

A south-west to north-east tube line called the Chelsea-Hackney line was proposed in 1970 by the then London Transport Board's London Rail Study as the next project after the completion of the Victoria line and the Fleet line (now the Jubilee line) but was not carried forward, it would have had a new tube station near Shoreditch Church if it was built.

Contemporary

Formerly a predominantly working-class area, since around 1996 Shoreditch has become a popular and fashionable part of London, particularly associated with the creative industries. Often conflated with its neighbouring sub-district of Hoxton, the area has been subject to considerable gentrification, with accompanying rises in land and property prices. Former industrial buildings have been converted to offices and flats, while Curtain Road and Old Street are notable for their clubs and pubs which offer a variety of venues to rival those of the West End. Art galleries, bars, restaurants, media businesses and the building of the Hackney Community College campus are features of this transformation.

In the mid-1960s, the main streets of Shoreditch (Old Street, Shoreditch High Street and Curtain Road, Great Eastern Street) were formed into a  one-way system, which became associated with traffic congestion, poor conditions for walking and cycling, high speeds, high collision rates, and delays for bus services. The gyratory system came to be seen as "the main factor holding back the cultural regeneration of South Shoreditch" and "a block to economic recovery". Following a lengthy campaign, the then newly formed Transport for London agreed to revert most of the streets to two-way working, a project which was completed in late 2002.

In 2005, funding was announced for the East London Line Extension, to extend the existing tube line from Whitechapel tube station bypassing Shoreditch tube station, and to create a new station named Shoreditch High Street closer to central Shoreditch. This is now served by London Overground services on part of the site of the old Bishopsgate Goods Yard, which was demolished in 2004. 
The station was built on a viaduct and is fully enclosed in a concrete box structure. This is so future building works on the remainder of the Bishopsgate site can be undertaken keeping the station operational.

Tower Hamlets Council made proposals to transfer the Boundary Estate to a housing association and upgrade the accommodation in 2006. A full refurbishment of one of the blocks, Iffley House was carried out by Sprunt Architects to demonstrate how this might be achieved but the proposal was rejected by a ballot of tenants in November of that year.

More recently, during the second "dot-com" boom, both the area and Old Street have become popular with London-based web technology companies who base their head offices around the East London Tech City district. These include Last.fm, Dopplr, Songkick, SocialGO and 7digital. These companies have tended to gravitate towards Old Street Roundabout, giving rise to the term "Silicon Roundabout" to describe the area, as used by Prime Minister David Cameron in a speech in November 2010.

As a result, the name of Shoreditch has become synonymous with the concept of contemporary "hipsterfication" of regenerated urban areas. As a pioneer among similar transformations across the UK, various phrases have been coined, from "Shoreditchification" to "Very Shoreditch".

In 2014, the Boundary Estate and the nearby area came under the East Shoreditch Neighbourhood Forum. Forum status ceased to have effect on 5 February 2019 but the Neighbourhood Area designation is unaffected by the expiry.

The Stag's Head public house was Grade II listed in 2015 by Historic England.

South Shoreditch has undergone an enormous transformation. Several five- or six-storey buildings have been knocked down in the area of Shoreditch that borders the City of London. In their place will be erected a variety of very tall buildings, mirroring the architectural styles in the City. The developments will result in more residential units being available for sale in Shoreditch than were produced by the Olympics athletes' village.

One landmark development is the Principal Tower in Worship Street, designed by the architects Foster and Partners, and next to it is Principal Place, also designed by Foster and Partners. In July 2014, it was reported that the internet retailer Amazon.com was close to signing a lease to move its UK headquarters there. The project had been on hold since January 2012, when the anchor tenant, the law firm CMS Cameron McKenna pulled out. Soon after, the developer Hammerson sold its interest in the scheme to Brookfield.

There has been some consideration of creating an interchange with the Central line between Liverpool Street and Bethnal Green at Shoreditch High Street, where the line runs almost underneath the station. However, this could not be seriously contemplated before the completion of the Crossrail project, owing to extreme crowding on the Central line during peak hours.

Two Huguenot workers' houses on Club Row on the corner of Redchurch Street, which developers had wished to knock down, were saved from demolition. They were deemed of special historic interest, giving the houses protection from destruction from 2019.

Geography

Shoreditch covers a wide area, but its historic heart lies south of Old Street, around Shoreditch High Street and Shoreditch Church. The districts of Hoxton and Haggerston have been historically part of Shoreditch since the medieval period and occupy the north-west and north-east of Shoreditch respectively; however, their extent has never been formally defined.

Although Shoreditch has been consistently defined, perceptions have blurred in recent years; something that became possible after the Metropolitan Borough of Shoreditch amalgamated with some of its neighbours to become the southern part of the London Borough of Hackney in 1965.

The location of the former Shoreditch tube station (closed 2006), 400 metres outside Shoreditch proper, in nearby Bethnal Green, Tower Hamlets, influenced this shift. Its replacement, Shoreditch High Street station, straddles the borough boundary.

More significant has been the gentrification of the Shoreditch area since the millennium, leading to a marked increase in the area's prestige, which has led businesses in the Bethnal Green and Spitalfields areas of Tower Hamlets to include the name Shoreditch in their company's name and marketing material. This is also seen to a lesser extent in the St Luke's area of the London Borough of Islington.

Administration 

Shoreditch was an administrative unit with consistent boundaries from the Middle Ages until its merger into the London Borough of Hackney in 1965. Shoreditch was based for many centuries on the Ancient Parish of Shoreditch (St Leonard's), part of the county of Middlesex.

Parishes in Middlesex were grouped into Hundreds, with Shoreditch part of Ossulstone Hundred. Rapid Population growth around London saw the Hundred split into several 'Divisions' during the 1600s, with Shoreditch part of the Tower Division (aka Tower Hamlets). The Tower Division was noteworthy in that the men of the area owed military service to the Tower of London – and had done even before the creation of the Division – an arrangement which continued until 1899.

The Ancient Parishes provided a framework for both civil (administrative) and ecclesiastical (church) functions, but during the nineteenth century there was a divergence into distinct civil and ecclesiastical parish systems. In London the Ecclesiastical Parishes sub-divided to better serve the needs of a growing population, while the Civil Parishes continued to be based on the same Ancient Parish areas.
 
For civil purposes, The Metropolis Management Act 1855 turned the parish area into a new Shoreditch District of the Metropolis, with the same boundaries as the parish. The London Government Act 1899 converted these areas into Metropolitan Boroughs, again based on the same boundaries, sometimes with minor rationalisations. The Borough's areas of Central Shoreditch, Hoxton and Haggerston were administered from Shoreditch Town Hall, which can still be seen on Old Street. It has been restored and is now run by the Shoreditch Town Hall Trust.

In 1965, Shoreditch was merged with Hackney and Stoke Newington to form the new London Borough of Hackney.

Governance
Shoreditch is home to the Baron Wei of Shoreditch, who lives in the area and sits as a Conservative life peer and Lords Temporal as part of the House of Lords. He was introduced on 3 June 2010.

The Hackney borough part of Shoreditch is part of the Hackney South and Shoreditch constituency, represented in the House of Commons of the UK Parliament since 2005 by Meg Hillier of the Labour Party and of the Co-operative Party

The eastern part of Shoreditch, in Tower Hamlets, lies within the constituency of Bethnal Green and Bow, represented since 2010 by Rushanara Ali of the Labour Party.

Notable local residents 

John Appold, FRS (1800–1865), a pioneer of the centrifugal pump
Russell Brand, actor and comedian
James Burbage, Tudor actor and impresario: built The Theatre; buried in Shoreditch church
Richard Burbage, actor in the Lord Chamberlain's Men, Shakespeare's own Company. Renowned for his performance of Shakespeare's greatest roles: Hamlet, Richard III, etc. Buried in the church.
William James Blacklock, British landscape artist, was born in Shoreditch in 1816
Joshua Compston, curator & founder of Factual Nonsense; instrumental in the development of the area's art scene in the early 1990s; lived & died in Charlotte Road.
Luke Evans, Welsh singer, musical performer and film actor lives here
Thomas Fairchild, gardener, the first person to scientifically produce an artificial hybrid
Noel Fielding, comedian, film and television actor
Paul Galvin, Irish fashion designer and former Gaelic footballer
Henry Hate, celebrity tattoo artist; clients include Boy George, Alexander McQueen, Amy Winehouse and Pete Doherty
Anissa Helou, cookbook author, teacher and chef specialising in the cuisines of the Mediterranean, Middle East and North Africa
Damien Hirst, artist; instrumental in the development of the area's art scene in the early 1990s
Dave Kaye, pianist, born in Shoreditch
Hetty King, a famous male impersonator of the music hall, was born here. Her father, William Emms, was a local comedian known as William King.
Jon Kortajarena, Spanish model and actor
Marie Lloyd Jr., actress and composer notable for her impersonations of her mother, Marie Lloyd.
Christopher Marlowe, Elizabethan dramatist lived in Norton Folgate, the southern continuation of Shoreditch High Street, and wrote plays for the Shoreditch theatres.
Hoxton Tom McCourt, influential in the late 1970s and early 1980s mod and oi/punk scenes and founder of the band, the 4-Skins, was born in Shoreditch in 1961.
Bill Meyer, printmaker and artist
Matt Monro, singer dubbed "the British Sinatra", famous for singing On Days Like These from the film The Italian Job and the title songs of the films Born Free and From Russia with Love 
Miquita Oliver, T4 presenter
James Parkinson, surgeon, apothecary, geologist, paleontologist and political activist who worked on what would later be named Parkinson's disease
Jem Smith, bare knuckle prize fighter
William Sommers, Henry VIII's jester; buried in Shoreditch church.
Szabotage, graffiti artist and designer
Richard Tarleton, Elizabethan comedian. Shakespeare's Yorick is believed to be a homage to his memory. Buried in Shoreditch church.
Russell Tovey, English actor
Andrew Weatherall, DJ, producer, and remixer
Nat Wei, Baron Wei, youngest non-hereditary peer ever upon entry to the House of Lords and government advisor on Big Society
Barbara Windsor, comedian, film and television actress was born there.

Education

Transport

Rail 
Shoreditch High Street station is near Boxpark, on Bethnal Green Road. The station is served by London Overground trains on the East London line, and is in London fare zone 1. Trains link the area directly to Dalston and Highbury & Islington to the northwest, whilst to the south, trains travel directly to major destinations like Canada Water, Clapham Junction, West Croydon, Crystal Palace, New Cross, Peckham and Whitechapel. Hoxton station is to the north of Shoreditch, on the same line.

Liverpool Street and Old Street tube stations are also nearby. Both stations are also on the National Rail network.

Until 2006, Shoreditch tube station was served by London Underground East London line trains. The line and station closed to make way for the London Overground.

Buses
London Buses provides all local bus services across the district: routes 8, 135, 205, 388, N8 and N205 on Great Eastern Street and Bishopsgate; routes 26, 35, 47, 48, 67, 78 and N26 on Shoreditch High Street; and routes 55, 149, 242, 243 and N55 on Old Street.

Cycling 
Two Transport for London (TfL) Cycleways pass through Shoreditch.

Cycle Superhighway 1 runs north-south along the western perimeter of the area, through the Old Street junction. The route is signposted, and links the area to Moorgate and Finsbury southbound, and to Dalston, Stoke Newington, and Seven Sisters to the north.

Quietway 13 runs east-west through Shoreditch, primarily on quiet streets. The route is signposted, and runs from Finsbury in the City to the Regent's Canal near Cambridge Heath.

The Regent's Canal towpath runs along the northernmost edge of the district, close to Shoreditch Park. The towpath is a shared-use path for pedestrians and cyclists and runs unbroken from Angel in Islington to Limehouse near Canary Wharf. Eastbound, the path links the area to Victoria Park and Mile End.

The London Cycle Hire Scheme operates in Shoreditch.

See also
 Curtain Road Arts
 East London Line
 Hackney College
 Hackney Community College Basketball Academy
 London United Basketball
 Nelson's Retreat Pub
 Shoreditch Park

References

Bibliography

External links

 A Tudor History of Shoreditch (from The National Archives)
 Shoreditch Town Hall
 The Shoreditch Map

 
Districts of the London Borough of Hackney
Districts of the London Borough of Tower Hamlets
Districts of the London Borough of Islington
Areas of London
Entertainment districts in the United Kingdom
Hipster neighborhoods